This is a list of the National Register of Historic Places listings in Limestone County, Texas.

This is intended to be a complete list of properties listed on the National Register of Historic Places in Limestone County, Texas. There are four properties listed on the National Register in the county.

Current listings

The publicly disclosed locations of National Register properties may be seen in a mapping service provided.

|}

See also

National Register of Historic Places listings in Texas
Recorded Texas Historic Landmarks in Limestone County

References

External links

Limestone County, Texas
Limestone County
Buildings and structures in Limestone County, Texas